Composed of approximately 55 military and civilian members, Fleet Survey Team (FST) is collocated with the
Naval Oceanographic Office and Commander, Naval Meteorology and Oceanography Command, at Stennis
Space Center, MS.

FST, an echelon-five command since 2006, is tasked with performing an unparalleled function within the U.S.
Navy.

The command enables combatant commanders with access in the littoral regions through expeditionary hydrography.
When forces are armed with detailed descriptions of the environmental conditions they could face, operations have
a greater chance of being safely and efficiently executed.

FST gathers the needed information via timely, self-contained hydrographic surveys in response to combatant
commanders’ requests. These requests frequently are for areas where Navy operations will take place or where charting
accuracy is uncertain.

FST members (both civilian and military) can quickly deploy to areas around the world outfitted with equipment
to perform surveys from various boats of opportunity. Because of these unique capabilities, civilian and military
members of FST have deployed to areas of combat like the Middle East to perform near-shore surveys to collect
data which aids in the safe navigation of U.S. forces and supplies traversing the area.

FST members have also played significant roles in charting areas affected by natural disasters such as the south
Asia tsunami of 2004 and hurricanes Katrina and Rita in the Gulf of Mexico.

Command personnel offer a unique blend of military and civilian knowledge and experience. Enlisted sailors
routinely qualify as level two military hydrographers, certifying their skills.

In addition to their strong backgrounds in math, science and engineering, officers and civilians frequently obtain
master’s degrees in hydrographic science through an ongoing program with The University of Southern Mississippi
and are also recognized by the International Hydrographic Office as Category A hydrographers.

Fleet Survey Team command members are commonly known as the Fightin’ Crawdads in reference to the crawfish featured prominently in the FST logo.

http://www.dtic.mil/cgi-bin/GetTRDoc?AD=ADA527615

External links
The Expert, Efficient and Responsive Resource for Littoral Battlespace Characterization and Hydrographic Surveys

United States Navy organization
Hydrography organizations